Joseph Healy (born 26 December 1986) is an English footballer who plays as a midfielder. He is currently a free agent. He has previously played in the Football League for Millwall.

References

1986 births
Living people
Footballers from Sidcup
Association football midfielders
English footballers
Millwall F.C. players
Crawley Town F.C. players
Walton & Hersham F.C. players
Fisher Athletic F.C. players
Yeading F.C. players
Beckenham Town F.C. players
Welling United F.C. players
Margate F.C. players
Maidstone United F.C. players
Dover Athletic F.C. players
Dartford F.C. players
Tonbridge Angels F.C. players
English Football League players
National League (English football) players
Isthmian League players